Sexycop 1976 Italian crime comedy film directed by Duccio Tessari. It is based on the novel with the same name written by  Massimo Felisatti and Fabio Pittorru.

Plot

Cast 
Christian De Sica as Vito Militiello 
Carole André as "La Madama"
Tom Skerritt as Jack
Ines Pellegrini as Irma 
Oreste Lionello as Inspector Solmi 
Ettore Manni as Sante Tonnaro 
Gigi Ballista as The Venetian
Francesco De Rosa as Squillace

Production
Sexycop was based on the novel La Madama written by Massimo Felisatti and Fabio Pittorru. The term Madama itself, was a Rome-based slang for Italy's mobile police, similar to the English slang "the fuzz". The book was the third in a series of novels and was adapted to film by director Duccio Tessari who turned the film into more of a comedy oriented film.

Release
Sexycop was distributed theatrically in Italy by Titanus on 16 January 1976. It grossed a total of 173,627,420 Italian lire domestically. The film has also been released as La Madama l'agente Minchiello e il caso Patacchioni. Italian film historian Roberto Curti described the Italian box office as "disappointing".

Reception
Curti stated that contemporary critics "ravaged the film". Corriere della Sera's Renato Palazzo found the film to be closer to "the childish comic-adventure series starring Bud Spencer and Terence Hill" noting that "this formula has been frayed for a long time." Orio Caldiron of La Rivista del cinematografo stated that although Tessari has never been a master filmmaker, wondered how far he could have lost his way with the film.

See also    
 List of Italian films of 1976

References

Bibliography

External links

1976 films
Italian crime comedy films
1970s crime comedy films
1970s Italian-language films
Films directed by Duccio Tessari
Films scored by Manuel De Sica
Titanus films
1976 comedy films
1970s Italian films